Usigni is a village in Umbria, a frazione of the comune of Poggiodomo in the Province of Perugia a few hundred metres downstream from the source of the Tissino River. It is located at 1,001 m (3,284 ft) above sea‑level.

The once-fortified village is now insignificant, with only 13 inhabitants according to the 2001 census, but was the home town of Fausto Cardinal Poli, private secretary to Pope Urban VIII, and benefited from his public-spiritedness: the church of S. Salvatore built by Poli in around 1640 was richly decorated with stuccos and frescos by Guidobaldo Abatini and Salvi Castellucci. Usigni is also very proud of an elegant well-head of the same period, attributed by some to Bernini, which it has adopted as its symbol.

References

External links
Usigni (Thayer's Gazetteer of Umbria)

Frazioni of the Province of Perugia
Hilltowns in Umbria